Gary Allan Knopp (July 14, 1957 – July 31, 2020) was an American politician who served in the Alaska House of Representatives from the 30th district as a member of the Republican Party.

Early life
Knopp was born on July 14, 1957 in Whitefish, Montana. In 1979, he moved to Alaska.

Career
Knopp was elected to the Kenai Peninsula Borough Assembly in Alaska in 2006, serving until 2012 (including two years as assembly president), when he retired in order to unsuccessfully run for the state house. Knopp won a third term on the Assembly in 2015, and successfully ran for the House in 2016.

Alaska House of Representatives
Knopp resigned from the Assembly on January 3, 2017, and was sworn in as a representative later that month.

In December 2018, Knopp left the Republican caucus in the House of Representatives to push for a bipartisan coalition. On May 17, 2019, he was censured by the Alaska Republican Party State Central Committee due to his role in forming a majority coalition in the House of Representatives with members of the Alaska Democratic Party.

During the 30th session of the Alaska House of Representatives, from 2017 to 2019, Knopp served on the Administration, University of Alaska, Commerce, Community and Economic Development, Labor and Workforce Development, Revenue, State Affairs, Arctic Policy, Economic Development and Tourism, and Labor and Commerce committees. During the 31st session, from 2019 to 2020, he served as the chairman of the Natural Resources, and Labor and Workforce Development committees and as a member on the Finance committee.

Personal life
Knopp was married to Helen. He died on July 31, 2020, when his private Piper PA-12 Super Cruiser aircraft collided with a deHavilland DHC-2 Beaver owned by High Adventure Air Charter, near Soldotna, Alaska. The other plane's six occupants also died in the crash. A National Transportation Safety Board (NTSB) investigation indicated that Knopp had hit the Beaver at the aft end of the fuselage, that he had taken off shortly after the Beaver, that his aircraft was not properly registered, and that Knopp had been denied a medical certificate in 2012 due to vision problems.

Electoral history

References

External links
 Gary Knopp government website

1957 births
2020 deaths
Borough assembly members in Alaska
Republican Party members of the Alaska House of Representatives
People from Whitefish, Montana
People from Kenai, Alaska
21st-century American politicians
Aviators killed in aviation accidents or incidents in the United States
Victims of aviation accidents or incidents in 2020
Accidental deaths in Alaska
Candidates in the 2012 United States elections